Sir Robert Niel Reid  (15 July 1883 – 24 October 1964) was a British colonial administrator in India. He was Governor of Assam from 1937 to 1942.

His son, Sir Robert Basil Reid, was chairman of the British Railways Board from 1983 until 1990.

References 

1883 births
1964 deaths
Governors of Assam
Indian Civil Service (British India) officers
Knights Commander of the Order of the Star of India
Knights Commander of the Order of the Indian Empire
People educated at Malvern College
Alumni of Brasenose College, Oxford
Recipients of the Kaisar-i-Hind Medal